A stormwater fee is a charge imposed on real estate owners for pollution in stormwater drainage from impervious surface runoff.

This system imposes a tax that is proportional to the total impervious area on a particular property, including concrete or asphalt driveways and roofs, that do not allow rain to infiltrate. In other words, the more area covered by impervious surfaces the more stormwater is generated and conveyed to the sewer, so the higher the stormwater fee.

Germany 
Equivalence issues were raised concerning the imposition of sewage fees based on the usage of water supply. In 1985, in order to ensure the legal equity of charging based on the polluter pays principle, the German Federal Administrative Court and the local high court ruled that the sewage system charges should be separately collected as usage fees for rainwater exclusion and as usage fees for sewage exclusion. This ruling became a decisive motive to bring about a switch in the sewage system for rainwater in Germany. The German states took legal action to impose a stormwater tax on developers like the builders who made artificial surface in the 1990s. Many resistances were raised, but Berlin, which had been the strongest opponent, has accepted the plan since 2000. About 73 percent of cities with a population of 100,000 or more apply a separate calculation method, which divides the cost of sewage into the rainwater cost. Usually, Germany calculates concrete, asphalt, and building roofs as impervious areas and charges an annual fee of $2.6 per m².  Builders are installing rainfall storage tank and permeation facilities to receive reduction in fees.  In addition, outdoor plant cultivation facilities and green business are also proposed as alternatives to the reduction of the stormwater fee.

Germany has seen two effects in this regard : increasing rainwater recycling rates and reducing sewage fee and tap water usage. Rain water recycling plays a great role in preventing the city from flooding in the event of heavy rain and saving energy.

Italy
Such taxes have been collected in regions of Italy, acquiring international attention, and challenging Italian tax morale. Authorities in Ravenna, Italy, have imposed 3% increase on local water bills to maintain and improve drainage systems. Officials cite the severe damage inflicted by the heavy rain on infrastructure, buildings and agriculture in the Po valley, insisting that this money urgently needs to be recouped. The local water board, which wants to backdate the new tax three years, claims that the payments will save it €1 million a year. Gianluca Dradi, head of environmental policy for the Ravenna city council, likened the levy to a street cleaning tax and clarified that those paying more for their water use, such as factories, will pay proportionately more than individual households. "Including the cost in water bills is more equitable," he told the Repubblica newspaper.

However, consumer organisations are opposing the move, and residents have been urged to resist the authorities and refuse to pay the tax.

United States

Maryland
A stormwater management tax was established via House Bill 987 (April 2012) and signed into law by then-governor Martin O'Malley, affecting the largest urban jurisdictions in Maryland (nine  counties and the City of Baltimore) in order to meet the requirements of the federal Clean Water Act as it concerns the Chesapeake Bay watershed. The Tax Foundation states House Bill 987 "was passed in response to a decree by the Environmental Protection Agency (EPA) formally known as the Chesapeake Bay Total Maximum Daily Load, which identified mandatory reductions in nitrogen, phosphorus, and sediment that damage the Chesapeake Bay." This mandate from the EPA was mandated to the states of Maryland, New York, Pennsylvania, West Virginia, and the District of Columbia. Maryland is the only state that has levied a tax to meet the EPA's standards. Polluted runoff is the only source in the Chesapeake Bay watershed that is still increasing, as of 2018. This tax, of course, does not tax rain but has been implemented in varying ways at the county level, such as a flat fee per property owner, or based on impervious surface square footage.

The law specifies that accrued funds must be used for specified stormwater pollution-related purposes.

This law was modified in 2015 to make the county-assessed fees optional rather than mandatory while still holding the counties responsible for making progress on managing polluted runoff.

Illinois
HB1522 (August, 2013) provides DuPage and Peoria counties with the option of charging fees to residents whose property benefits from county stormwater management.  HB1522 allows the counties to assess the tax in a nonuniform manner, based on their own rules, exemptions and special considerations.  Home rule municipalities in Illinois have always had the ability to establish special fees under their own ordinances.

The City of Elgin, Illinois was planning to assess the Stormwater Utility Tax in 2014, but an outraged public and decisive election results caused the Elgin City Council to unanimously reject the tax.

How to Calculate Potential Stormwater Fee

 To calculate your potential Stormwater Fee, you should know "ERU (Equivalent Residential Unit)".  The ERU is a measurement of the amount of impervious square footage that a typical residence contains which is calculated to be 3000 square feet based upon the aggregate of a driveway, garage roof, house roof, and miscellaneous paving. Users are categorized according to the characteristics of the business or resident.  Every property will be charged monthly based upon how many ERU's it has.
 Residential : Based upon the low end figure Strand Associates provided to the Council last October, one ERU for a typical residential property will cost $3 per month.  On the high end, Downers Grove has a storm water utility tax and charges $8.40 per ERU per month. That translates to a fee from $36 to $100.80 annually for homeowners.
 Commercial : As an example, if you own a piece of property with impervious surface totaling 9000 square feet, you divide that by 3000, resulting in 3 ERU's. Using from $3 to $8.40 per ERU above, it could cost from $108 to $302.40 annually for a business, not for profit, church, etc.

References

Environmental tax
Stormwater management